The Cartographica is an interdisciplinary peer-reviewed academic journal and the official publication of the Canadian Cartographic Association, 
in affiliation with the International Cartographic Association.
Cartographica is published four times a year by the University of Toronto Press.

Abstracting and indexing
The journal is abstracted and indexed in:
 Academic Search Alumni Edition
 Academic Search Complete
 Academic Search Elite
 Academic Search Premier
 Canadian Reference Centre
 Emerging Sources Citation Index (ESCI)
 Microsoft Academic Search
 Scopus
 Ulrich's Periodicals Directory

See also
Canadian Journal of Remote Sensing

References

External links

University of Toronto Press academic journals
Quarterly journals
Publications established in 1964
English-language journals
Geography journals
Cartography
Academic journals associated with learned and professional societies of Canada